Prauserella marina is a bacterium from the genus Prauserella which has been isolated from ocean sediments from the South China Sea near China.

References

Pseudonocardiales
Bacteria described in 2010